Fort Street is a street in North Point in Hong Kong. The street, primarily residential, runs from west to east, parallel to King's Road, at a higher elevation. It is the location of the terminus of Hong Kong Island Green Minibus Route 65. 

The eastern half of the street is a private road. Drivers pay to the cashier's office at the corner of North View Street for parking their vehicles.

Name 
 The street was named after the nearby North Point Battery, established in 1879 and demolished in 1922.

See also 
 Fort Street (constituency)
 Fortress Hill
 List of streets and roads in Hong Kong

References

Roads on Hong Kong Island
North Point